Leave Your Sleep is the fifth studio album by American singer-songwriter Natalie Merchant. Produced by Merchant and Andres Levin, the double concept album is "a project about childhood" and is a collection of music adapted from 19th and 20th century British and American poetry about childhood. BBC Music describes it as "200 years of lyrical and musical history, washing beautifully by."

Tracks

Inspiration
The sleeve notes credit inspiration for the songs of this album as follows:
 Adventures of Isabel – Ogden Nash
 Autumn Lullaby – Anonymous
 Bleezer's Ice-Cream – Jack Prelutsky
 Calico Pie – Edward Lear
 Crying, My Little One – Christina Rossetti
 If No One Ever Marries Me – Laurence Alma-Tadema<ref>If No One Ever Marries Me poem by Laurence Alma-Tadema, ArtMagick Illustrated Poetry Collection</ref>
 Indian Names – Lydia Huntley Sigourney
 I Saw a Ship A-Sailing – Anonymous
 It Makes a Change – Mervyn Peake
 Equestrienne – Rachel Field
 Griselda – Eleanor Farjeon
 Maggie and Milly and Molly and May – E. E. Cummings
 Nursery Rhyme of Innocence and Experience – Charles Causley
 Spring and Fall – Gerard Manley Hopkins
 Sweet and a Lullaby – Anonymous
 The Blindmen and the Elephant – John Godfrey Saxe
 The Dancing Bear – Albert Paine
 The Janitor's Boy – Nathalia Crane
 The King of China's Daughter – Anonymous
 The Land of Nod – Robert Louis Stevenson
 The Man in the Wilderness – Anonymous
 The Peppery Man – Arthur Macy
 The Sleepy Giant – Charles E. Carryl
 The Walloping Window Blind – Charles E. Carryl
 Topsyturvey-World – William Brighty Rands
 Vain and Careless – Robert Graves

Charts

Album

 Reception BBC Music'' gave a review following the album's release:What’s astonishing is how cohesive it all is: from the fire-eyed, Celtic-tinged chamber music of Nursery Rhyme of Innocence and Experience, through to the stark, troubled strings of the closing Indian Names, Leave Your Sleep never feels over-extended. The sheer ravishing beauty of the arrangements, combined with the tasteful, organic aesthetic (no synths here), prevents things ever jarring, and Merchant’s voice flows constant throughout, supple and hard as silken steel. Indeed, everything sounds so good from a purely musical perspective that the record perhaps doesn’t showcase its lyricists as well as it could. It’s hard to really see that it cumulatively says anything about childhood, except perhaps that it's the lurid bits that stick with you – Charles E. Carryl’s faintly traumatic The Sleepy Giant is a piece of grotesque that's hard to ignore. But most of these poems simply sink into the verdant whole – 200 years of lyrical and musical history, washing beautifully by.

References

External links
 Natalie Merchant, "Leave Your Sleep" by Billboard
 

Concept albums
2010 albums
Natalie Merchant albums
Nonesuch Records albums